Thor Longus or Thor the Long (fl. c. 1113×1124) was an early 12th-century Anglo-Saxon noble associated with Roxburghshire, a culturally Northumbrian and Brythonic  Cumbric Celtic (Carvetii, Brigantes, Selgovae) territory ruled by the Scottish king from the 11th-century onwards. A charter dating between 1107×1113 and 1124 claims that Thor the Long founded Ednam, previously a deserted waste granted to him by King Edgar of Scotland.

Ednam lies close to the Northumberland border with Roxburghshire. The charter states that he repopulated the settlement with his own followers and built a church. The charter grants the church to the monks of St Cuthbert. There survives the notice of this grant given by Thor to his lord Earl David (future David I of Scotland), as well as Earl David's confirmation of the same grant.

Thor had a brother named Leofwine, mentioned in Thor's charter as requiring "redemption". Leofwine "the monk" was commemorated in the Martyrology of the Durham Cantor's book for June 2 (day of death), and in the same source Thor Longus was commemorated for May 14. The year of his death and descendants are not known, but Ednam appears to have been transferred into the Crown's hands by 1136, so he can be presumed dead by that date.

Several Scottish families/clans claim either lineage or name-sake of Thor Longus (Longus is Latin for 'Long/Laing/Lang meaning 'Tall' in Anglish/German/Scots/etc): 
 Stirling
 Crawford
 Nisbet
 Swinton

See also
 Thor of Tranent

Notes

References

 
 
 
 (1970). Burke's peerage and baronetage. London, Burke's Peerage.

12th-century deaths
12th-century English people
Anglo-Norse people
People associated with the Scottish Borders
Year of birth unknown